Frederick Saugrain LeBlanc Sr. (July 24, 1897 – June 11, 1969), was an American politician in the US state of Louisiana who was Louisiana attorney general from 1944 to 1948 and from 1952 to 1956. He was a member of the Democratic Party.

References

1897 births
1969 deaths